Sumner is an unincorporated community in Levy County, Florida, United States.

References

Unincorporated communities in Levy County, Florida
Unincorporated communities in Florida